Marcin Maliński (born 10 January 1973) is a retired Polish swimmer who won three medals in the 200 m and 400 m individual medley events at European World championships in 1995. He also competed in these disciplines at the 1992 and 1996 Summer Olympics with the best achievement of seventh place in 1996.

He was born as a son of a military officer Zbigniew Maliński and started swimming aged 5. Between 1989 and 1991 he was training at the Mission Viejo Nadadores club in the United States. In 1997 he returned to the US to study at Indian River State College in Fort Pierce, Florida, and then at Drury University in Springfield, Missouri. He then moved to Iceland, where he works as a swimming coach and competes in the masters category. His younger brothers, Jakub and Michał, were also competitive swimmers.

References

1973 births
Living people
Polish male medley swimmers
Swimmers at the 1992 Summer Olympics
Swimmers at the 1996 Summer Olympics
Olympic swimmers of Poland
People from Jarocin
Medalists at the FINA World Swimming Championships (25 m)
European Aquatics Championships medalists in swimming
Sportspeople from Greater Poland Voivodeship
20th-century Polish people